Statue of Lord Cornwallis may refer to:

 The statue of Lord Cornwallis in St. Paul's Cathedral, London, 
 The statue of Lord Cornwallis in the Fort Museum, Fort St. George, Chennai 
 The statue of Lord Cornwallis in the Victoria Memorial, Kolkata